Diapterna hamata is a species of aphodiine dung beetle in the family Scarabaeidae. It is found in North America.

References

Further reading

 
 

Scarabaeidae
Beetles of North America
Beetles described in 1824
Taxa named by Thomas Say
Articles created by Qbugbot